Myalitsyno is a rural locality (a village) in Nesterovskoye Rural Settlement, Sokolsky District, Vologda Oblast, Russia. The population was 11 as of 2002.

Geography 
Myalitsyno is located 33 km north of Sokol (the district's administrative centre) by road. Nesterovo is the nearest rural locality.

References 

Rural localities in Sokolsky District, Vologda Oblast